Amanda Duff (March 6, 1914 - April 6, 2006) was an American actress on stage and in films.

Biography
Duff was born in Fresno, California, and grew up in Santa Barbara, California. She went on to study music at Mills College and later to study piano in New York City.

Early years
She was discovered by the playwright Robert E. Sherwood who cast her in a Broadway production of Tovarich (1936). She played Helene DuPont, a daughter of a rich family.

Duff's films included The Devil Commands (1941) and Mr. Moto in Danger Island (1939).

In 1939, she married screenwriter and film director Philip Dunne. They had three daughters.

Later life
After Duff retired from acting, she took up photography. Her work was recognized when the presentation "Glimpses of the USA" at the American National Exhibition in Moscow in 1959 include some of her photographs of American children.

On April 6, 2006, Duff died of cancer in San Francisco, California, at age 92. She was survived by three daughters, a brother, and two grandchildren.

Filmography
 Just Around the Corner (1938)
 Mr. Moto on Danger Island (1938)
 The Three Musketeers (1939, uncredited)
 Hotel for Women (1939)
 The Escape (1939)
 City of Chance (1940)
 Star Dust (1940, uncredited)
 The Devil Commands (1941)

References

External links

1914 births
2006 deaths
American film actresses
American stage actresses
People from Fresno, California
20th-century American actresses
21st-century American women